Michael Thomas Calveley (born 22 June 1999) is an English professional footballer who plays as a midfielder for  club Chorley.

He turned professional at Port Vale in May 2017 and went on to play on loan at Leek Town and Nuneaton Borough. Released in May 2019, he signed for Curzon Ashton four months later. He joined Chorley in July 2020.

Career

Port Vale
Calveley turned professional at Port Vale in May 2017; he signed a one-year contract shortly after receiving the club's Youth Player of the Year award. On 13 September 2017, he joined Northern Premier League Division One South side Leek Town on a one-month loan. Vale manager Michael Brown said that he sanctioned the loan move because of his respect for "Blues" manager Neil Baker. He scored his first senior goal with a 25-yard strike in Town's 4–1 FA Trophy victory over Lincoln United at Harrison Park on 7 October. He was recalled by new "Valiants" manager Neil Aspin to make his senior debut in a 4–2 victory over Crewe Alexandra in an EFL Trophy group stage match at Vale Park on 7 November.

On 19 July 2018, he joined National League North side Nuneaton Borough on loan, along with teammate Dior Angus. He made his debut for "Boro" on the opening day of the 2018–19 season, and went in goal for the last ten minutes of the game after goalkeeper Louis Gray was sent off, managing to keep a clean sheet as his new team recorded a 0–0 draw with Ashton United. On 26 December, he scored his first goal for Nuneaton in a 3–1 defeat at A.F.C. Telford United. On 19 January, he scored both of Nuneaton's goals in their 2–2 draw at Hereford. He was recalled from his loan spell by new Vale manager John Askey in April, having scored four goals in 42 matches for Nuneaton. However he played just two minutes for Vale as a substitute and Askey confirmed that he would not be offering Calveley a new contract on 16 May; meanwhile he was voted as Nuneaton's players' player of the year.

Curzon Ashton
Calveley joined National League North side Curzon Ashton and made his debut for the "Nash" on 28 September 2019, in a 2–1 defeat at Farsley Celtic. He scored three goals in 22 games during the 2019–20 season, which was curtailed early due to the COVID-19 pandemic in England.

Chorley
He was signed by National League North rivals Chorley on 8 July 2020. Manager Jamie Vermiglio said that "he'll bring strength and energy to the midfield and our supporters will no doubt appreciate his work ethic". The "Magpies" enjoyed a deep run in the FA Cup, making it through three rounds of qualification with wins over Gateshead and York City and a bye. In the First Round Proper, they came from two goals down to beat Wigan Athletic 3–2 after extra-time, with Calveley providing the assist for Elliot Newby in Chorley's first goal of the comeback. They beat another League One side away from home in the second round, Peterborough United, and Calveley scored the winning goal on 62 minutes. He also scored in the next round as Chorley beat Championship side Derby County 2–0 at Victory Park. The cup run came to an end in the fourth round with a 1–0 home defeat to Premier League side Wolverhampton Wanderers. However the 2020–21 season was curtailed early in February due to the pandemic. He agreed a one-year contract extension in October 2021, keeping him at Chorley until summer 2023. He scored three goals across 42 appearances in the 2021–22 campaign, including playing in the play-off quarter-final defeat to York City.

Style of play
Port Vale youth team coach Mick Ede stated that Calveley is "a big midfielder, a destroyer, but when he gets on the ball you know he generally looks for that forward pass and breaks lines".

Career statistics

References

1999 births
Living people
Sportspeople from Chester
English footballers
Association football midfielders
Port Vale F.C. players
Leek Town F.C. players
Nuneaton Borough F.C. players
Curzon Ashton F.C. players
Chorley F.C. players
Northern Premier League players
English Football League players
National League (English football) players